Eurylychnus is a genus of beetles in the family Carabidae, containing the following species:

 Eurylychnus blagravii (Castelnau, 1868)
 Eurylychnus cylindricus Sloane, 1916
 Eurylychnus dyschirioides (Castelnau, 1868)
 Eurylychnus femoralis Sloane, 1915
 Eurylychnus kershawi Sloane, 1915
 Eurylychnus olliffi Bates, 1891
 Eurylychnus ovipennis Sloane, 1915
 Eurylychnus regularis Sloane, 1911
 Eurylychnus victoriae Sloane, 1892

References

Nothobroscina
Carabidae genera